The Ball–Ehrman House is a house located in southwest Portland, Oregon, listed on the National Register of Historic Places.

See also
 National Register of Historic Places listings in Southwest Portland, Oregon

References

Further reading

Houses on the National Register of Historic Places in Portland, Oregon
Houses completed in 1923
1923 establishments in Oregon
A. E. Doyle buildings
Portland Historic Landmarks
Southwest Hills, Portland, Oregon